Corebus (c. 117–138) converted to Christianity by St. Eleutherius. Shortly afterwards he was made a prefect of Messina, Sicily. He suffered martyrdom at the hands of Emperor Hadrian in 138.

References

138 deaths
Sicilian saints
2nd-century Christian martyrs
Year of birth unknown
Year of birth uncertain